The British Rail Class 204 designation has been used twice for two similar types of diesel-electric multiple units.

History
The original units, numbered in the range 1119-1122, were two-car versions of the Class 205 '3H' units, and were classified as 2H under the old system.

In 1979, BR decided to augment the two-car units to three-car formation. Three of the four units were reformed with the addition of centre trailers taken from 3H (Class 205) units, and thus were themselves reclassified as Class 205.

The fourth 2H unit, and the three former 3H units which had given up their trailers, were augmented by reusing the ex-2EPB driving trailers from redundant Class 206 units. The Class 204 designation was re-applied to these four newly formed units (which were also given the classification 3T under the old system). They were renumbered into the range 1401-1404. In 1986, the units were renumbered to 204001-004 to conform with the TOPS numbering system.

Technical details

Power car (one per set)

 Introduced: 1957
 Weight: 
 Transmission: Diesel-electric, two English Electric type EE507 traction motors rated at  each.
 Maximum tractive effort: 
 Driving wheel diameter: 
 Coupling code: Standard 'Buckeye'  compatible with contemporary class 20x and 4xx units.
 Train heating: Electric

Fleet details

Original Class 204 (2H) Units

Reformed Class 204 (3T) Units

* ex-Class 205

Preservation
Of the original 2H units, a single driving trailer has been preserved.
205008 (ex-1121) - DTCsoL 60820 - Hastings Diesels, currently at the Lavender Line.

None of the reformed 3T units are preserved.

References

Further reading

External links
 Hastings Diesels

204
Diesel electric multiple units
Train-related introductions in 1957